Tutu may refer to:

 Tutu (clothing), a dress worn as a costume in a ballet performance
 Tutu (name), including a list of people with that name

Arts and entertainment
 Tutu (album), by Miles Davis, 1986
 "Tutu" (song), a 2019 song by Camilo and Pedro Capó
 "Tutu", a 2020 song by 6ix9ine from TattleTales
 "Tūtū", a composition by Liliuokalani
 Princess Tutu, an anime series, and its title character
 Tutu, the wife of Tottles, a Lewis Carroll fictional character
 Tutu (painting), by Ben Enwonwu

Places
 Tutu, U.S. Virgin Islands, a subdistrict Saint Thomas
 Tutu Island, in the Arno Atoll of the Marshall Islands
 Tūtū, or Rabiabad, a village in South Khorasan Province, Iran
 Tuţu, a village in Corbița, Vrancea County, Romania

Other uses
 Tutu (Egyptian god), during the Late Period
 Tutu (Egyptian official), one of pharaoh's officials during the Amarna letters period
 Tutu (Mesopotamian god), a creation god
 Tutu (plant), poisonous New Zealand plants of the genus Coriaria

See also

 
 TU (disambiguation)
 Two two (disambiguation)
 Osei Tutu, founder of the Ashanti Empire
 Tootoo, an Inuit surname
 Tututni, a native american tribe